The 2007 Humboldt State Lumberjacks football team represented Humboldt State University during the 2007 NCAA Division II football season. Humboldt State competed as an independent in 2007, as the Great Northwest Athletic Conference (GNAC) did not sponsor football for the 2006 and 2007 seasons.

The 2007 Lumberjacks were led by head coach Doug Adkins in his eighth and last year at the helm. They played home games at the Redwood Bowl in Arcata, California. Humboldt State finished the season with a record of two wins and eight losses (2–8). The Lumberjacks were outscored by their opponents 141–321 for the 2007 season.

In the eight years of Doug Adkins tenure as head coach, the Lumberjacks compiled an overall record of 33–51,. They had only one winning season (2006) during those eight years.

Schedule

Notes

References

Humboldt State
Humboldt State Lumberjacks football seasons
Humboldt State Lumberjacks football